George Arney is a journalist for BBC and was until 2009 one of the hosts of The World Today and Outlook on the BBC World Service. He was educated at Clifton College and Cambridge.

Life
Arney was a BBC producer and a BBC correspondent in Pakistan in the 1980s. He hosted BBC Radio 4's Crossing Continents. He has written a book book on Afghanistan.

He was BBC correspondent in Pakistan from 1986 to 1988, and BBC correspondent in Sri Lanka from 1994 to 1996.

Arney has written for newspapers and journals including The Guardian and The Economist.
 
In 2007 he was named International Radio Personality of the Year by the Association for International Broadcasting (AIB).

Personal life
Arney is separated from wife Razia Iqbal, a BBC journalist.

References

External links
George Arney's bio-sketch on BBC Online
BBC World Service presenter profile of George Arney (with a short video profile).
 A review of George Arney's "Afghanistan"  and 

Year of birth missing (living people)
Living people
People educated at Clifton College
BBC newsreaders and journalists
BBC World Service presenters